New Mexico Junior College (NMJC) is a public junior college in unincorporated Lea County, New Mexico, near Hobbs.

History and campus
New Mexico Junior College first opened in the fall of 1966. With a current enrollment of 3,375.

Organization and administration
The college district within Lea County supports NMJC by a tax levy.

Academics
About 3,000 students attend NMJC, approximately 70% of whom are part-time students. 47% of students are aged 25 or over. Only about half of full-time students graduate, and only about 34% of part-time students graduate. NMJC has an open admission policy.

NMJC offers Associate of Arts, Associate of Science, and Associate of Applied Science degrees along with certificates. There are over 640 courses of study offered annually through NMJC's two instructional sectors: (a) Arts and Sciences and (b) Business and Technology. NMJC also offers certificate programs in many academic areas.

Athletics
NMJC fields NJCAA Division I teams in men's baseball, men's and women's basketball, men's golf, women's track and field, women's cross country, and men's and women's rodeo. Its baseball team won the NJCAA World Series in 2005, its first championship. Their mascot is the Thunderbird. The men's and women's basketball games are broadcast locally on KNMJ 100.9 FM.

Notable alumni
Chris Boucher, NBA player for the Toronto Raptors
Avery Johnson, former NBA player and basketball coach
Nick Pivetta (born 1993), Major League Baseball pitcher for the Boston Red Sox
Tharon Drake (born 1992), Paralympic swimmer; won silver at the 2016 Summer Paralympics
Jason Siggers (born 1985), basketball player in the Israel Basketball Premier League
Armando Almanza (born 1972), MLB pitcher, World Series Champion 2003, Florida Marlins
Jose Flores (born 1971), MLB infielder Oakland A's
Mike Vento (born 1979), MLB outfielder New York Yankees
David Carpenter (born 1988), MLB pitcher Anaheim Angels
Brian Flores (1985), NJCAA Player of the Year (baseball) 2005
Jenifer Jones, nurse and member of the New Mexico House of Representatives

References

External links
Official website

 
University of the Southwest
Education in Lea County, New Mexico
Educational institutions established in 1965
Two-year colleges in the United States
Public universities and colleges in New Mexico
NJCAA athletics
1965 establishments in New Mexico